Benabena is a stretch of valley that extends to the east of Goroka town in the west and borders with the Upper Ramu area of the Madang Province to the north, the Ungaii District to its south and the Henganofi District to its east. The name "Bena Bena' derived from a small hamlet or village just a few kilometres away from the once small rural station of Sigerehi in the Upper Bena area in the Eastern Highlands of Papua New Guinea. 
The Bena Bena Valley had once known for a centre for weaving. The town was known also as Bena Bena.

History
An airfield was constructed near the village by Dan Leahy and Jim Taylor in December 1932. A Lutheran mission station commenced operations at the village in 1934.

References
Benabena information

Populated places in Eastern Highlands Province